The 2016 Notre Dame Fighting Irish men's soccer team represented the University of Notre Dame during the 2016 NCAA Division I men's soccer season. It was the program's 40th season.

Roster

Schedule

|-
!colspan=6 style="background:#002649; color:#CC9933;"| Exhibition
|-

|-

|-

|-
!colspan=6 style="background:#002649; color:#CC9933;"| Regular Season
|-

|-

|-

|-

|-

|-

|-

|-

|-

|-

|-

|-

|-

|-

|-

|-

|-

|-
!colspan=6 style="background:#002649; color:#CC9933;"| ACC Tournament
|-

|-

|-

References

External links 
 2015 Schedule

Notre Dame Fighting Irish
Notre Dame Fighting Irish men's soccer seasons
Notre Dame Fighting Irish, Soccer
Notre Dame Fighting Irish
Notre Dame Fighting Irish